Ateeq Javid (born 15 October 1991) is a former English cricketer. He started his cricket career at Aston Manor CC where he was picked up for Warwickshire. He played club cricket for West Bromwich Dartmouth in the Birmingham Premier League when he moved on from Aston Manor. He is a right-handed batsman and a right arm off spin bowler. He made his debut for the county in June 2009 against Durham UCCE. Ateeq went to Aston Manor Academy along with professional footballer Saido Berahino, cricketer Recordo Gordon and MMA fighter Leon Edwards.

In September 2017, it was announced that Javid would leave Warwickshire at the end of the season to join Leicestershire on a two-year contract ahead of the 2018 season.  An opportunity to open against Durham brought his only half-century of the season in 10 attempts in 2018, and he was released at the end of the 2019 season.

Awards and nominations
In January 2015, Javid was nominated for the Best at Sport award at the British Muslim Awards.

Anti-Semitism
In November 2021 Javid was revealed to have exchanged a series of anti-Semitic posts with former England Under 19 team-mate Azeem Rafiq on Facebook in 2011.

References

External links
 

1991 births
Living people
English cricketers
Warwickshire cricketers
Leicestershire cricketers
Cricketers from Birmingham, West Midlands
British Asian cricketers
English cricketers of the 21st century